Can You Hear Us? is the debut studio album and third album overall by David Crowder Band and the first recorded for sixstepsrecords, released in February 2002.

Critical reception

Can You Hear Us? garnered a positive reception from music critics. At Jesus Freak Hideout, J.D. gave the album three-and-a-half stars highlighting the album as "a good start." Ashleigh Kittle of Allmusic gave the album four stars calling the release "intense and thought-provoking, yet at the same time lyrically tender". At Cross Rhythms, Jonathan Evans gave the album a nine out of ten squares commenting that the album is "Gutsy, edgy praise music from a talented musicianary, this deserves wide exposure." However, Andy Argyrakis of Christianity Today gave the album its only mixed rating at two-and-a-half stars cautioning that "For those seeking innovation in worship music, you'd best look elsewhere."

Track listing

Personnel 

 Kristin Barlowe – Photography
 Jeremy Bush – Drums
 Christiév Carothers – Creative Director
 Jan Cook – Art Direction
 David Crowder – Guitar (Acoustic), Arranger, Guitar (Electric), * Vocals, Vocals (background)
 Grant Cunningham – Executive Producer
 David Davidson – Violin, Viola
 Michael Dodson – Bass
 Russ Fowler – Mixing
 Louie Giglio – Executive Producer
 Mike Hogan – Violin, Noise
 Jacquire King – Mixing
 Sarah Macintosh – Vocals (background)
 Stephen Marcussen – Mastering
 Brent Milligan – Arranger, Producer, Engineer
 Jack Parker – Guitar (Electric), Keyboards
 Benji Peck – Art Direction, Design
 Robbie Seay – Vocals (background)
 Steve Short – Mixing
 Jason Solley – Guitar (Electric)
 Shane D. Wilson – Engineer, Mixing

References

2002 debut albums
David Crowder Band albums